The Tahiti women's national under-17 football team is the second highest women's youth team of women's football in French Polynesia. The team consists of a selection of players from French Polynesia, not just Tahiti. The team is controlled by the Tahitian Football Federation.

History
Tahiti never participated in the OFC U-17 Women's Championship so far. However, in 2017 they will participate for the first time.

OFC
The OFC Women's Under 17 Qualifying Tournament is a tournament held once every two years to decide the only qualification spot for Oceania Football Confederation (OFC) and representatives at the FIFA U-17 World Cup.

Current technical staff

Current squad
The following players were called up for the 2017 OFC U-16 Women's Championship

Caps and goals correct after match against New Caledonia on August 12, 2017.

References

External links
Tahiti Football Federation page
Oceania Football Federation page

Women's national under-17 association football teams
Under-17